Rohtak Lok Sabha constituency is one of the 10 Lok Sabha (parliamentary)  constituencies in the Indian state of Haryana. This constituency covers the entire Rohtak and Jhajjar districts and part of Rewari district.

Assembly segments
At present, Rohtak Lok Sabha constituency comprises nine Vidhan Sabha (legislative assembly) constituencies. These are:

Members of Parliament

^ denotes by-polls

Election results

2019

2014

2009

See also
 Rohtak district
 List of Constituencies of the Lok Sabha

References

Lok Sabha constituencies in Haryana
Rohtak district
Jhajjar district